Azure DevOps may refer to:

 Azure DevOps Server, collaboration software for software development formerly known as Team Foundation Server and Visual Studio Team System
 Azure DevOps Services, cloud service for software development formerly known as Visual Studio Team Services, Visual Studio Online and Team Foundation Service Preview

See also
 Microsoft Azure
 Microsoft Visual Studio
 DevOps, a general term of a set of practices that combines software development (Dev) and IT operations (Ops)